Alfred Ernest Novak, C.Ss.R. (Portuguese: Alfredo Ernesto Novak)(June 2, 1930 – December 3, 2014) was an American member of the Congregation of the Most Holy Redeemer, commonly referred to as the Redemptorists, who worked as a missionary in Brazil. He served as the second Bishop of the Roman Catholic Diocese of Paranaguá from 1989-2006.

Biography
Novak was born in Dwight, Nebraska. He was educated at the Redemptorist minor seminary, St. Joseph’s College, in Kirkwood, Missouri. He was admitted to the congregation at their novitiate in De Soto, Missouri, where he professed religious vows as a Redemptorist. He studied for the priesthood at Immaculate Conception Seminary in Oconomowoc, Wisconsin and was ordained there on July 2, 1956.

Novak was serving as a missionary in Brazil when, on April 19, 1979, Pope John Paul II named him Titular Bishop of Vardimissa and an Auxiliary Bishop of São Paulo. He was ordained a bishop by Cardinal Paulo Evaristo Arns, O.F.M., the Archbishop of São Paulo. The principal co-consecrators were Bishops José Ivo Lorscheiter of Santa Maria and Aloísio Ariovaldo Amaral, C.Ss.R., of Limeira.  He served the archdiocese for ten years.

On March 15, 1989, Pop John Paul named Novak as the second Bishop of Paranaguá. He served the diocese as its bishop for 17 years before Pope Benedict XVI accepted his resignation on August 2, 2006, and he was granted the title of bishop emeritus.

See also

References

1930 births
2014 deaths
People from Butler County, Nebraska
American Roman Catholic missionaries
Roman Catholic missionaries in Brazil
Redemptorist bishops
20th-century Roman Catholic bishops in Brazil
21st-century Roman Catholic bishops in Brazil
American expatriates in Brazil
Catholics from Nebraska
Roman Catholic bishops of São Paulo
Roman Catholic bishops of Paranaguá